Pataveh Rural District is a rural district (dehestan) in Pataveh District, Dana County, Kohgiluyeh and Boyer-Ahmad Province, Iran. At the 2006 census, its population (including Pataveh, which was subsequently promoted to city status and detached from the rural district) was 14,983, in 2,978 families; excluding Pataveh, the population (as of 2006) was 13,068, in 2,601 families. The rural district has 48 villages.

References 

Rural Districts of Kohgiluyeh and Boyer-Ahmad Province
Dana County